The 1918 Camp Grant football team represented Camp Grant near Rockford, Illinois, during the 1918 college football season. The team compiled a 3–3 record.

Schedule

References

Camp Grant
Camp Grant Warriors football seasons
Camp Grant football